Valeria Bystritskaia (born 20 June 1986 in Moscow, Soviet Union) is a Russian-born German beauty queen, model and actress. She was born to a Ukrainian Jewish mother and Russian father, and moved to Germany with her mother at age 7 to escape antisemitism in Russia. She was elected on July 7, 2011, in Berlin during the Berlin fashion Week as Miss Universe Germany 2011.

She represented Germany at Miss Universe 2011 on 12 September 2011 in São Paulo in Brazil. Valeria Bystritskaia is 176 cm tall and her measurements are 86-60-90 cm. Following her victory she faced anti-Semitic harassment, despite having not publicized her Jewish background during the Miss Universe pageant. She decided to leave Germany and settled in the United States. In 2017, she married Joel Mowbray, the founder of Fourth Factor Consulting, who is also Jewish.

References

External links 
Official website Valeria Bystritskaia
Official website Miss Universe Germany
Profile (de)
Miss Universe Deutschland 2011 retrieved 15 July 2011 (de)                                                                                   

Miss Universe 2011 contestants
1986 births
Living people
Russian emigrants to Germany
Actors from Karlsruhe
German beauty pageant winners
German people of Ukrainian-Jewish descent
Jewish female models